Jonathan Snowden Skinner is an American health economist and the James O. Freedman Presidential Professor in Economics at Dartmouth College, as well as a professor in the Department of Family and Community Medicine at Dartmouth's Geisel School of Medicine and at The Dartmouth Institute for Health Policy and Clinical Practice. He is known for his research on health care spending. He has been a member of the National Academy of Medicine (formerly known as the Institute of Medicine) since 2007.

Bibliography

References

External links
Personal website
Faculty page

Living people
Health economists
21st-century American economists
Dartmouth College faculty
Members of the National Academy of Medicine
Geisel School of Medicine faculty
University of California, Los Angeles alumni
Date of birth missing (living people)
Year of birth missing (living people)